Fredrick Leatherbarrow Molyneux (born 1873) was an English footballer who played in the Football League for Stoke.

Career
Molyneux joined Stoke after leaving the 3rd Grenadiers in 1897. He was made reserve forward by Horace Austerberry and played 14 matches in two season scoring 5 goals. During the 1898–99 season Stoke had a fine run in the FA Cup reaching the semi-final against Derby County, due to injury to Jack Farrell Molyneux started the match and Stoke went on to lose 3–1. The local paper, The Evening Sentinel criticised Molyneux's performance and he left the club soon after. He later went on to play for several Southern League clubs.

Career statistics

References

English footballers
3rd Grenadier Guards F.C. players
Stoke City F.C. players
Bristol City F.C. players
Worcester City F.C. players
Dudley Town F.C. players
Luton Town F.C. players
Fulham F.C. players
Kidderminster Harriers F.C. players
English Football League players
1873 births
Footballers from Bolton
Year of death missing
Association football forwards